William Robert Baxter  (born August 1960 in Inverness, Scotland) is a British foodservice and hospitality entrepreneur.  Baxter remains actively involved with the industry in which he played a leading figure for over 30 years and continues to serve the sector as Chairman of Hospitality Action since 2010. Baxter is also Chairman of the Scannappeal, a charity which raises funds to purchase life saving medical equipment for hospitals in Buckinghamshire.

Life
Baxter was the son of Ron Baxter, a civil engineer, who attended the University of Cambridge and was Chairman of Halcrow and Gillian Baxter. Baxter spent his early life in Scotland and Mid-Wales, until he was eight, when his family moved to Harrow-on-the-Hill, Middlesex. Although he is dyslexic, Baxter obtained sufficient A Levels and was offered places at university to study architecture, but instead decided to choose a career in hospitality, after realising that “Seven years looked like a long time. I bottled out". Between 1979 and 1982, Baxter achieved a Higher National Diploma Hotel and Catering Industry Institutional Management at City of Westminster College

Baxter met his wife whilst studying at Westminster College and they have 3 sons and 1 daughter.

Career
Baxter began his career in 1978, working at the Selfridge Hotel. In 1982, Baxter joined Sutcliffe Catering, and rising to become one of their youngest ever Area Managers. He left in 1987 to set up his first contract catering operation, Baxter and Platts which he co-founded with Rob Platts. He sold this business to Granada in 1997 and staying with the company until 1999 as Executive Chairman. In 2000 Baxter launched his next contract catering venture, BaxterSmith, with Mike Smith which he merged with the then WSH to become BaxterStorey, taking on the role of Deputy Chief Executive until his retirement in 2011.

Baxter retired from commercial life in 2011.

References

1960 births
Living people
Catering
Commanders of the Order of the British Empire
Alumni of the University of Cambridge
People from Inverness
People with dyslexia